Sergei Anatolyevich Vasilyev (born 3 November 1982) is a former Russian professional football player.

External links
 
 

1982 births
People from Stary Oskol
Living people
Russian footballers
Association football midfielders
Russian expatriate footballers
Expatriate footballers in Ukraine
Expatriate footballers in Belarus
Belarusian Premier League players
Ukrainian Premier League players
FC Metalist Kharkiv players
FC Metalist-2 Kharkiv players
FC Naftan Novopolotsk players
FC Spartak Vladikavkaz players
FC Fakel Voronezh players
FC Tambov players
FC Energomash Belgorod players
Sportspeople from Belgorod Oblast